Shannon Delany is an American fantasy novelist who created the 13 to Life series, published by St. Martin's Press.

Early life and education 
Shannon Delany has written stories since she was a child. She graduated from Kutztown University of Pennsylvania, where she studied secondary social studies education.

Career
Delany worked as a teacher before deciding to pursue her writing career. 

In 2008, her greatly abbreviated version of 13 to Life (written in just five weeks) won the grand prize in the first-ever cell phone novel contest in the western world through Textnovel.com.

Shannon was thrilled when St. Martin’s Press offered her a contract for a series about her 13 to Life characters. She expanded on the cell phone novel version, adding the subplots and characters she didn’t have time to during the contest. As paranormal as werewolves seem, the grief Shannon used to build Jess’s character is something she experienced with the loss of her own mother. Focusing on Jess and Pietr’s story of loss, love and dramatic and dangerous changes, Shannon came to better grips with her own struggle. The resulting novel has earned her blurbs from authors she respects most.

In 2008, Delany was the grand-prize winner of the first-ever cell phone novel contest which can be found at www.textnovel.com. The winning novel was a greatly abbreviated version of 13 to Life. After seeing her work, she was approached by St. Martin's Press to turn her short story into a full-length novel.

Published on June 22, 2010, 13 to Life, her young adult romance involving a teenage girl named Jessie and a werewolf called Pietr, has met positive reviews from many authors. The book has grown to be a five-book series, according to the author on her Facebook page, with the fourth book, Destiny and Deception, awaiting its release on 31 January 2012. It is to be followed by a fifth book named rivals and retribution, estimated to hit bookshelves in the summer of 2012.

Delany has been praised by Lucienne Diver, author of VAMPED, who said, "A fun, gothic romance of suspense, secrets and the dangerous truth behind the new kid in town."

Another positive comment was from the award-winning author of SHADE and BAD TO THE BONE, Jerri-Smith Ready wrote that "Jessie and Pietr's bond is sweet and real, with more than a touch of delicious danger. An original, pulse-pounding story!"

"Hooked by the inquisitive and bright heroine, and reeled in by the mystery of the new kid, I couldn't stop reading this fast-paced debut!" said Maria V. Snyder, the New York Times bestselling author of FIRE STUDY.

Personal life
She now lives on a farm in Upstate New York, raising heritage livestock and heirloom plants, while writing on the side. Delany, due to her interest in traveling and foreign languages, is fluent in English, French, German, and Spanish. She began writing in earnest when her grandmother fell unexpectedly ill during a family vacation.

Bibliography
 13 to Life, St. Martin's Griffin, 2010
 "Beasts and BFFs" (short story), St. Martin's Griffin, 2010
 Secrets and Shadows, St. Martin's Griffin, 2011
 Bargains and Betrayals, St. Martin's Griffin, 2011
 Destiny and Deception, St. Martin's Griffin, 2012
 Rivals and Retribution, St. Martin's Griffin, 2012
 Weather Witch, St. Martin's Press, 2013
 Stormbringer, St. Martin's Griffin, 2014
 Thunderstruck, St. Martin's Griffin, 2014

References

External links 
 Author's Facebook page 
 Author's website
 http://www.textnovel.com%20www.textnovel.com%5D
 https://www.amazon.com/13-Life-Shannon/Delany/dp/B0058M5YKQ/ref=ntt_at_ep_dpt_4
 http://%20http://www.facebook.com/profile.php?id=100000948694520&sk=info
 http://www.facebook.com/profile.php?id=100000948694520&sk=info] 
 https://web.archive.org/web/20111023221932/http://shannondelany.com/joomla/index.php/about-the-author.html
 http://www.shannondelany.com/joomla/index.php?option=com_content&view=article&id=47&Itemid=53

Living people
21st-century American novelists
American fantasy writers
American women novelists
Women science fiction and fantasy writers
21st-century American women writers
Kutztown University of Pennsylvania alumni
Year of birth missing (living people)